Bloody Roar Extreme, or Bloody Roar: Primal Fury as it is known outside of its Japan release for the GameCube, is a fighting game developed by Eighting released in 2002 for the Nintendo GameCube. It was later ported to the Microsoft Xbox under the original moniker of Bloody Roar Extreme in 2003.

Gameplay 
Each character has a set of moves spread across a punch, kick, beast and block button, which is also used for throws. Special moves are primarily performed using quarter-circle or half-circle motions and a face button, though several exceptions exist. Attacks can be blocked with either a light guard, performed by not pressing forward or backward, or a heavy guard by holding back or the block button. Various attacks in the game can break through and stagger opponents using a light block. Various characters also have light block counters, which work against certain high or mid-level punches and kicks.

Players start each fight with a full life bar and a Beast Gauge, which allows them to transform into a stronger half-animal fighter. This gauge fills as the player performs moves or gets attacked. It fills with either a blue bar, indicating the player cannot switch to beast form, or a yellow bar with the words "BEAST CHANGE!!" appearing above it, meaning the player can transform. While in beast form, both the life bar and the Beast Gauge deplete. An emptied life bar results in a knockout, but emptying the Beast Gauge and knocking the opponent down reverts them to human form. Also, it reverts the Beast Gauge to the blue bar, preventing them from transforming again until it is refilled.

While in beast form, the player gains various effects, such as:

 An extra set of moves, performed using the beast button.
 Higher damage for attacks.
 30 percent of any damage taken can be regenerated, shown as a blue bar extending from the life bar.
 Access to Beast Drives, powerful cinematic attacks unique to each character which deal a large amount of damage. Every character has at least two. Characters revert to human form whether the Beast Drive hits or not. Missed Beast Drives tend to replenish a bit of health.
 Additional cancel points, allowing for part of one move to quickly transition to another.
 Various additional effects. For example, the effects of some throws (e.g. damage, position relative to opponent, combo potential) change. Alice's beast form greatly increases her jump height. Bakuryu's regular punch attacks include claw slashes.
 Different victory animations, should the player stay in beast form as the fight ends.

Players can also enter a stronger, faster version of beast form called Hyper Beast for a short period of time, displayed by the Beast Gauge slowly draining, before reverting to human form. While in prior entries a full Beast Gauge was required to do this, in Extreme this form can be accessed at any time. However, engaging this form with a less-than-full bar will drain part of the character's life bar. While in Hyper Beast form:

 The timer freezes.
 Cancel points greatly increase, allowing for faster and more unpredictable sequences of attacks.
 Beast Drives do not revert a character to human form, unless the Beast Gauge empties.
 Any damage taken recovers faster than in regular beast form.

Between rounds the state of each character and their Beast Gauge is preserved. For example, if a character finishes a round in beast form with a near-empty Beast Gauge, they will start the next round that way.

Extreme's modes of play include Arcade, Versus and Training mode, as well as:

 Time Attack - Finish the Arcade mode fights as fast as possible.
 Survival - Win as many fights as possible in a row against computer opponents, earning slight life refills by winning matches quickly.
 Team Battle - Choose between three and five characters and fight opposing teams, switching characters as each gets knocked out. This mode has a multiplayer equivalent.

Story 
With human-Zoanthrope relations still unstable, a place called the Kingdom of Zoanthropes is founded to help end oppression and conflict. Roughly 80 percent of its residents are Zoanthropes, though both Zoanthropes and humans are considered equal. This new land, however, relies heavily on Zoanthrope soldiers and mercenaries as a source of income, selling their service to various foreign countries. Rumors also persist that the Kingdom is conducting some sort of experiments on Zoanthropes, all while some citizens object to its authoritarian rule, threatening the ideal of peace for all Zoanthropes. In an effort to demonstrate their mercenaries' strength to foreign powers and train additional soldiers, the Kingdom holds a Zoanthrope fighting tournament, with the winner earning the title of "Strongest Zoanthrope" and a large cash prize.

Development 
Extreme's development began shortly after Bloody Roar 3 was completed. While prior entries in the series were on Sony consoles, the decision was made to move to Nintendo's GameCube primarily because of its hardware specifications. Direction Kenji Fukuya cited the lighting and shading capabilities in particular as reasons that Extreme could become the best looking Bloody Roar game. However, while the GameCube is capable of displaying games with progressive scan, this feature ultimately was not included.

Extreme includes seven new arenas and three remodeled levels from Bloody Roar 3. In addition, all characters have different character models. While the controls largely remain the same, some characters have slightly altered move sets and combos so that players do not have to press two face buttons at the same time.

While Fukuya stated in a prior interview that Extreme was "always destined for the GameCube," a port for the Xbox released roughly one year later. While ostensibly the same game, the Xbox version changed the animated cutscenes at the beginning and end of the game to computer-generated ones created by a separate team of animators. In addition, a hidden character previously only accessible in the Japanese version (Fang, the Wolf, a character from the Bloody Roar manga) was left in the North American and European releases.

The Gamecube version is backwards compatible with earlier models of the Wii, while the Xbox version is incompatible with the Xbox 360.

Reception 

Bloody Roar Extreme received mixed to positive reviews. GameSpot's Greg Kasavin said of the game's accessibility "you wouldn't be lying if you tried to reassure them that it's easy to get into and get good at Bloody Roar: Primal Fury." On using the GameCube controller, he noted "Whether the GameCube controller would be good for other fighting games is still an open question, but it's perfectly fine for use with Bloody Roar: Primal Fury." Matt Casamassina of IGN praised the game's Beast Gauge system, describing it as "a careful dance of knowing when to change and when to stay put ensues, and thus deepens the fighting experience. It's challenging to be sure, intuitively set up and a lot of fun." On the controls, he added "The control setup, which has always come into question with the GameCube pad, works triumphantly whether one chooses to go with the analog stick or the admittedly pint-sized D-Pad."

Reviews were often critical of the game's sound design and simplicity. Kasavin said the game's soundtrack, "consisting of completely uncool guitar riffs, is perhaps a suitable match for its anime-influenced character designs, though it can also get rather irritating." Casamassina echoed the sentiment, saying the game's sound design "falls somewhere between average and "why are they using this 80's guitar riff?" Indeed, some of the musical selections are downright aged, with a dusty sound that could only be used nowadays in a Japanese 3D fighter or a Sonic the Hedgehog update." Kasavin would add "if you've ever wondered what the pejorative expression "button masher" really refers to, you'll find out when you play Bloody Roar: Primal Fury," saying that overall Primal Fury "isn't as good as any of the latest installments in the major 3D fighting game series out there, though it's totally competent and quite appealing in some ways."

The Xbox port received more mixed reviews. On the change from animated to computer-generated cutscenes, Kasavin said "For some reason, Bloody Roar Extreme replaces Primal Fury's anime intro and ending sequences with prerendered CG cutscenes that look OK at best. Bloody Roar's in-game graphics are actually better..." Other reviewers stated that the fighting system was starting to feel outdated, the graphical change and addition of a few new moves and characters wasn't enough to differentiate it from prior entries, and Hudson needed to stop recycling material from older titles.

References

External links
 
 

2002 video games
Bloody Roar
GameCube games
Xbox games
Activision games
Konami games
Eighting games
Hudson Soft games
Fighting games
Multiplayer and single-player video games
Video games developed in Japan